The Portuguese ambassador in Beijing is the official representative of the Government in Lisbon to the Government of the People's Republic of China.

History
In 1511 Manuel I of Portugal sent Ambassador Fernão Pires de Andrade to China to ask for trading privileges.
In 1517 a formal Portuguese embassy got bogged down in Chinese protocol and procrastination, and China expelled the Portuguese in 1522.
In 1979 the government of Portugal left the Holy See as last European subject of international law with diplomatic relations with the government in Taipei.

List of representatives

References 

 
China
Portugal